Hugh Gallacher (26 November 1930 – 14 June 2013) was a Scottish footballer who played for Arbroath, Dumbarton, Clyde, Queen of the South and South Shields.

Gallacher is best known for his time at Dumbarton where in less than eight seasons scored 205 goals in major competitions from 220 games for the club. He played a massive role in the revival of Dumbarton FC who had been relegated to C Division in 1954. The following season Dumbarton benefited from a league reconstruction, where subsequently they finished in the top half of the Second Division for the first time in many years.

References

1930 births
2013 deaths
Scottish footballers
Dumbarton F.C. players
Arbroath F.C. players
Clyde F.C. players
Queen of the South F.C. players
Scottish Football League players
Association football forwards